The 2021 Group 7 Rugby League season was the 109th season of rugby league in the New South Wales country region of Group 7. On the 16th August 2021, it was announced by the New South Wales Ruby League governing body that all competitions in Group 7 would be abandoned due to the ongoing issues involving COVID-19 in the area and surrounding regions.

1st Grade

Teams 

Reference(s):

Ladder

Season results

Round 1

Round 2

Round 3

Round 4 

 All fixtures for Round 4 were postponed because of ground closures due to rainfall.

Round 5

Round 6

Round 7

Round 8 

 Note: The fixture between Jamberoo and Nowra-Bomaderry was postponed due to players waiting for COVID-19 results after a recent outbreak.

Round 9

Round 10

Round 11 

 Note: Fixtures scheduled for Sunday, 27 July were declared to be COVID draws due to the ongoing COVID-19 pandemic in the Shellharbour and surrounding regions.

Round 12 

 Note: All Round 12 & 13 fixtures became COVID draws due to the ongoing COVID-19 pandemic in the Shellharbour and serounding regions.

Round 13 

 Note: All Round 12 & 13 fixtures became COVID draws due to the ongoing COVID-19 pandemic in the Shellharbour and serounding regions.

Round 14

Round 15

Round 16

Round 17

Round 18

Finals series

Reserve Grade (2nd Grade)

Teams

Ladder

Season results

Round 1

Round 2

Round 3

Round 4 

 All fixtures for Round 4 were postponed because of ground closures due to rainfall.

Round 5

Round 6

Round 7

Round 8 

 Note: The fixture between Jamberoo and Nowra-Bomaderry was postponed due to players waiting for COVID-19 results after a recent outbreak.

Round 9 

 Note: The fixture between Albion Park-Oak Flats and Milton-Ulladulla was forfeitted by Milton-Ulladulla, therefore, Albion Park-Oak Flats were awarded an automatic fifty point win.

Round 10

Round 11 

 Note: Fixtures scheduled for Sunday, 27 July were declared to be COVID draws due to the ongoing COVID-19 pandemic in the Shellharbour and serounding regions.

Round 12 

 Note: All Round 12 & 13 fixtures became COVID draws due to the ongoing COVID-19 pandemic in the Shellharbour and serounding regions.

Round 13 

 Note: All Round 12 & 13 fixtures became COVID draws due to the ongoing COVID-19 pandemic in the Shellharbour and serounding regions.

Round 14

Round 15

Round 16

Round 17

Round 18

Finals series

Regan Cup (3rd Grade)

Teams

Ladder

Season results

Round 1

Round 2

Round 3

Round 4 

 All fixtures for Round 4 were postponed because of ground closures due to rainfall.

Round 5 

 Note: The fixture between Sussex Inlet Panthers and Shellharbour Sharks was forfeitted by Shellharbour Sharks, therefore, Sussex Inlet Panthers were awarded an automatic fifty point win.

Round 6

Round 7

Round 8 

 Note: The fixture between Wreck Bay United and Southern Highlands was declared to be a COVID draw due to a spike in COVID-19 cases in the region.
Note: The fixture between Albion Park Outlaws and Sussex Inlet was forfeitted by Albion Park, therefore, Sussex Inlet were awarded an automatic fifty point win.

Round 9

Round 10

Round 11 

 Note: Fixtures scheduled for Sunday, 27 July were declared to be COVID draws due to the ongoing COVID-19 pandemic in the Shellharbour and serounding regions.

Round 12 

 Note: All Round 12 & 13 fixtures became COVID draws due to the ongoing COVID-19 pandemic in the Shellharbour and serounding regions.

Round 13 

 Note: All Round 12 & 13 fixtures became COVID draws due to the ongoing COVID-19 pandemic in the Shellharbour and serounding regions.

Round 14

Round 15

Round 16

Round 17

Round 18

Finals series

Under-18's

Teams

Ladder

Season results

Round 1 

 Note: The fixture between Gerringong and Mt. Warrigal United was forfeitted by Mt. Warrigal United, therefore, Gerringong were awarded an automatic fifty point win.

Round 2

Round 3

Round 4 

 All fixtures for Round 4 were postponed because of ground closures due to rainfall.

Round 5 

 Note: The fixture between Kiama and Nowra-Bomaderry was forfeitted by Kiama, therefore, Nowra-Bomaderry were awarded an automatic fifty point win.

Round 6

Round 7

Round 8 

 Note: The fixture between Stingrays of Shellharbour and Kiama was forfeitted by Kiama, therefore, Stingrays of Shellharbour were awarded an automatic fifty point win.
Note: The fixture between Jamberoo and Nowra-Bomaderry was postponed due to players waiting for COVID-19 results after a recent outbreak.

Round 9

Round 10

Round 11 

 Note: Fixtures scheduled for Sunday, 27 July were declared to be COVID draws due to the ongoing COVID-19 pandemic in the Shellharbour and serounding regions.

Round 12 

 Note: All Round 12 & 13 fixtures became COVID draws due to the ongoing COVID-19 pandemic in the Shellharbour and serounding regions.

Round 13 

 Note: All Round 12 & 13 fixtures became COVID draws due to the ongoing COVID-19 pandemic in the Shellharbour and serounding regions.

Round 14

Round 15

Round 16

Round 17

Round 18

Final Series

Ladies League Tag Division 1

Teams

Ladder

Season results

Round 1

Round 2

Round 3

Round 4 

 All fixtures for Round 4 were postponed because of ground closures due to rainfall.

Round 5

Round 6

Round 7

Round 8 

 Note: The fixture between Jamberoo and Nowra-Bomaderry was forfeited by Nowra-Bomaderry, therefore, Jamberoo were awarded an automatic fifty point win.

Round 9

Round 10

Round 11 

 Note: Fixtures scheduled for Sunday, 27 July were declared to be COVID draws due to the ongoing COVID-19 pandemic in the Shellharbour and serounding regions.

Round 12 

 Note: All Round 12 & 13 fixtures became COVID draws due to the ongoing COVID-19 pandemic in the Shellharbour and serounding regions.

Round 13 

 Note: All Round 12 & 13 fixtures became COVID draws due to the ongoing COVID-19 pandemic in the Shellharbour and serounding regions.

Round 14

Round 15

Round 16

Round 17

Round 18

Finals series

Ladies League Tag Division 2

Teams

Ladder

Season results

Round 1

Round 2

Round 3

Round 4 

 All fixtures for Round 4 were postponed because of ground closures due to rainfall.

Round 5

Round 6

Round 7

Round 8 

 Note: The fixture between Jamberoo and Nowra-Bomaderry was forfeitted by Nowra-Bomaderry, therefore, Jamberoo were awarded an automatic fifty point win.
Note: The fixture between Wreck Bay United and Gerringong was declared to be a COVID draw due to a spike in COVID-19 cases in the region.

Round 9

Round 10

Round 11 

 Note: Fixtures scheduled for Sunday, 27 July were declared to be COVID draws due to the ongoing COVID-19 pandemic in the Shellharbour and serounding regions.

Round 12 

 Note: All Round 12 & 13 fixtures became COVID draws due to the ongoing COVID-19 pandemic in the Shellharbour and serounding regions.

Round 13 

 Note: All Round 12 & 13 fixtures became COVID draws due to the ongoing COVID-19 pandemic in the Shellharbour and serounding regions.

Round 14

Round 15

Round 16

Round 17

Round 18

Finals series

References 

2021 in Australian rugby league
Rugby league in New South Wales
Rugby league competitions in New South Wales